The Asia/Oceania Zone was one of the three zones of the regional Davis Cup competition in 2000.

In the Asia/Oceania Zone there were four different tiers, called groups, in which teams competed against each other to advance to the upper tier. The top two teams in Group III advanced to the Asia/Oceania Zone Group II in 2001, whereas the bottom two teams were relegated to the Asia/Oceania Zone Group IV in 2001.

Participating nations

Draw
 Venue: National Tennis Centre, Colombo, Sri Lanka
 Date: 9–13 February

Group A

Group B

1st to 4th place play-offs

5th to 8th place play-offs

Final standings

  and  promoted to Group II in 2001.
  and  relegated to Group IV in 2001.

Round robin

Group A

Qatar vs. Pacific Oceania

Bangladesh vs. Kuwait

Qatar vs. Kuwait

Bangladesh vs. Pacific Oceania

Qatar vs. Bangladesh

Kuwait vs. Pacific Oceania

Group B

Singapore vs. Tajikistan

Sri Lanka vs. Singapore

Syria vs. Tajikistan

Sri Lanka vs. Tajikistan

Syria vs. Singapore

Sri Lanka vs. Syria

1st to 4th place play-offs

Semifinals

Syria vs. Qatar

Kuwait vs. Sri Lanka

Final

Syria vs. Kuwait

3rd to 4th play-off

Sri Lanka vs. Qatar

5th to 8th place play-offs

5th to 8th play-offs

Singapore vs. Bangladesh

Tajikistan vs. Pacific Oceania

5th to 6th play-off

Singapore vs. Tajikistan

7th to 8th play-off

Bangladesh vs. Pacific Oceania

References

External links
Davis Cup official website

Davis Cup Asia/Oceania Zone
Asia Oceania Zone Group III